Irwin Avenue is a streetcar station in Charlotte, North Carolina. The at-grade island platform on West Trade Street is a stop along the CityLynx Gold Line, serving Johnson & Wales University and Gateway Village.

Location 
Irwin Avenue station is located at the intersection of West Trade Street, Irwin Avenue, and Johnson & Wales Way, in Uptown Charlotte. The immediate area features multi-level apartments, Johnson & Wales Charlotte campus, and Gateway Village office park. Also nearby, one to two blocks away, is Fraizer Park, Irwin Creek Greenway, and James Dennis Rash Park.

History 
Irwin Avenue station was approved as a Gold Line Phase 2 stop in 2013, with construction beginning in Fall 2016. Though it was slated to open in early-2020, various delays pushed out the opening till mid-2021. The station opened to the public on August 30, 2021.

Station layout 
The station consists of an island platform with two passenger shelters; a crosswalk and ramp provide platform access from West Trade Street. The station's passenger shelters house two art installations by Jim Hirschfield and Sonya Ishii.

References

External links
 

Lynx Gold Line stations
Railway stations in the United States opened in 2021
2021 establishments in North Carolina